Verma is a variant spelling of the surname Varma (name).

Verma may also refer to:

People
 Verma Malik, Bollywood lyricist
 Verma Panton, Jamaican architect
 H. L. Verma, business science academic and administrator
 Mr. and Mrs. Verma, the fictional hosts of the cooking show Mr. Aur Mrs. Verma Ki Rasoi

Places
 Verma, Møre og Romsdal, a village in Rauma municipality in Møre og Romsdal county, Norway

See also 
 Verma module, a type of mathematical object in the representation theory of Lie algebras